The 2016 Rally Finland (formally known as the 66. Neste Rally Finland) was the eighth round of the 2016 World Rally Championship season, an auto racing event for rally cars. It was held over twenty-four stages based in and around Jyväskylä in central Finland from 28 July to 31 July 2016, with competitors covering  of competitive kilometres. It was won by Northern Irishman Kris Meeke, his second win of the season. Meeke established a new record for the fastest FIA WRC round in history - the 126.60 km/h average speed beat the previous record by 1.2 km/h.

Entry list

Source: https://www.ewrc-results.com/entries/27496-neste-rally-finland-2016/

Overall standings

Special stages

Power Stage
The "Power stage" was a  stage at the end of the rally.

References

Finland
Rally Finland
Rally